Tirunarayur Siddhanatheswarar Temple
(திருநறையூர் சித்தநாதேசுவரர் கோயில்
)is a Hindu temple located at Tirunarayur in Thanjavur district, Tamil Nadu, India. The presiding deity is Shiva. He is called as Siddha Natheswarar. His consort is known as Soundarya Nayaki.

Significance 
 It is one of the shrines of the 275 Paadal Petra Sthalams - Shiva Sthalams glorified in the early medieval Tevaram poems by Tamil Saivite Nayanars Tirugnanasambandar and Sundarar.

Literary mention 
Tirugnanasambandar describes the feature of the deity as:

References

External links 
 
 

Shiva temples in Thanjavur district
Padal Petra Stalam